The term classification can apply to one or all of:

 the process of classifying (distinguishing and distributing kinds of "things" into different groups)
 a resulting set of classes (also called "a classification system")
 the assignment of elements to pre-established classes

Classifying – in the broad meaning given above – is a fundamental concept and a part of almost all kinds of activities.

Classification itself is an interdisciplinary field of study. Important contributing disciplines include philosophy, biology, knowledge organization, psychology, statistics and mathematics.

Definitions 
Frederick Suppe distinguished two senses of classification: a broad meaning, which he called "conceptual classification" and a narrow meaning, which he called "systematic classification".

About conceptual classification Suppe (1989, 292) wrote: "Classification is intrinsic to the use of language, hence to most if not all communication. Whenever we use nominative phrases we are classifying the designated subject as being importantly similar to other entities bearing the same designation; that is, we classify them together. Similarly the use of predicative phrases classifies actions or properties as being of a particular kind. We call this conceptual classification, since it refers to the classification involved in conceptualizing our experiences and surroundings"

About systematic classification Suppe (1989, 292) wrote: "A second, narrower sense of classification is the systematic classification involved in the design and utilization of taxonomic schemes such as the biological classification of animals and plants by genus and species.

Basic units 
Hull (1998) suggested "The fundamental elements of any classification are its theoretical commitments, basic units and the criteria for ordering these basic units into a classification".

The basic units in a classification system are classes.

There is a widespread opinion in knowledge organization and related fields that such classes corresponds to concepts. We can, for example, classify ‘waterfowls’ into the classes “ducks”, “geese”, and “swans”; we can also say, however, that the concept “waterfowl” is a generic broader term in relation to the concepts “ducks”, “geese”, and “swans”. This example demonstrates the close relationship between classification theory and concept theory. A main opponent of concepts as units is Barry Smith (cf. Smith 2004). Arp, Smith and Spear (2015, 5ff) discuss ontologies and criticize the conceptualist understanding.  The book writes (7): “The code assigned to France, for example, is ISO 3166 – 2:FR and the code is assigned to France itself — to the country that is otherwise referred to as Frankreich or Ranska. It is not assigned to the concept of France (whatever that might be).” Smith's alternative to concepts as units is based on a realist orientation, when scientists make successful claims about the types of entities that exist in reality, they are referring to objectively existing entities which realist philosophers call universals or natural kinds. Smith's main argument - with which many followers of the concept theory agree - seems to be that classes cannot be determined by introspective methods, but must be based on scientific and scholarly research. Whether units are called concepts or universals, the problem is to decide when a thing (say a "blackbird") should be considered a natural class. In the case of blackbirds, for example, recent DNA analysis have reconsidered the concept (or universal) "blackbird" and found that what was formerly considered one species (with subspecies) are in reality many different species, which just have chosen similar characteristics to adopt to their ecological niches (Fjeldså 2013, 141).

An important argument for considering concepts the basis of classification is that concepts are subject to change and that they changes when scientific revolutions occur. Our concepts of many birds, for example, have changed with recent development in DNA analysis and the influence of the cladistic paradigm - and have demanded new classifications. Smith's example of France demands an explanation. First, France is not a general concept, but an individual concept. Next, the legal definition of France is determined by the conventions that France has made with other countries. It is still a concept, however, as Leclercq (1978) demonstrates with the corresponding concept Europe.

Hull (1998) continued: "Two fundamentally different sorts of classification are those that reflect structural organization and those that are systematically related to historical development." What is referred to is that in biological classification the anatomical traits of organisms is one kind of classification, the classification in relation to the evolution of species is another (in the section below, we expand these two fundamental sorts of classification to four).  Hull adds that in biological classification, evolution supplies the theoretical orientation.

Methods of classification 
Ereshefsky (2000) presented and discussed three general philosophical schools of classification: "essentialism, cluster analysis, and historical classification. Essentialism sorts entities according to causal relations rather than their intrinsic qualitative features." 

These three categories may, however, be considered parts of broader philosophies. Four main approaches to classification may be distinguished: (1) logical and rationalist approaches including "essentialism"; (2) empiricist approaches including cluster analysis (It is important to notice that empiricism is not the same as empirical study, but a certain ideal of doing empirical studies. With the exception of the logical approaches they all are based on empirical studies, but are basing their studies on different philosophical principles). (3) Historical and hermeneutical approaches including Ereshefsky's "historical classification" and (4) Pragmatic, functionalist and teleological approaches (not covered by Ereshefsky). In addition there are combined approaches (e.g., the so-called evolutionary taxonomy", which mixes historical and empiricist principles).

Logical and rationalist approaches 
 Logical division (top-down classification or downward classification) is an approach that divides a class into subclasses and then divide subclasses into their subclasses, and so on, which finally forms a tree of classes. The root of the tree is the original class, and the leaves of the tree are the final classes. Plato advocated a method based on dichotomy, which was rejected by Aristotle and replaced by the method of definitions based on genus, species, and specific difference. The method of facet analysis (cf., faceted classification) is primarily based on logical division. This approach tends to classify according to "essential" characteristics, a widely discussed and criticized concept (cf., essentialism). These methods may overall be related to the rationalist theory of knowledge.

Empiricist approaches 
"Empiricism alone is not enough: a healthy advance in taxonomy depends on a sound theoretical foundation" (Mayr 1968, 548)
 Phenetics or Numerical taxonomy is by contrast bottom-up classification, where the starting point is a set of items or individuals, which are classified by putting those with shared characteristics as members of a narrow class and proceeding upward. Numerical taxonomy is an approach based solely on observable, measurable similarities and differences of the things to be classified. Classification is based on overall similarity: The elements that are most alike in most attributes are classified together. But it is based on statistics, and therefore does not fulfill the criteria of logical division (e.g. to produce classes, that are mutually exclusive and jointly coextensive with the class they divide). Some people will argue that this is not classification/taxonomy at all, but such an argument must consider the definitions of classification (see above). These methods may overall be related to the empiricist theory of knowledge.

Historical and hermeneutical approaches 
 Genealogical classification is classification of items according to their common heritage. This must also be done on the basis of some empirical characteristics, but these characteristics are developed by the theory of evolution. Charles Darwin's main contribution to classification theory of not just his claim "... all true classification is genealogical ..." but that he provided operational guidance for classification (cf., Richard 2016, pp. 90–92). Genealogical classification is not restricted to biology, but is also much used in, for example, classification of languages, and may be considered a general approach to classification." These methods may overall be related to the historicist theory of knowledge. One of the main schools of historical classification is cladistics, which is today dominant in biological taxonomy, but also applied to other domains. 

The historical and hermeneutical approaches is not restricted to the development of the object of classification (e.g., animal species) but is also concerned with the subject of classification (the classifiers) and their embeddedness in scientific traditions and other human cultures.

Pragmatic, functionalist and teleological approaches 
 Pragmatic classification (and functional and teleological classification) is the classification of items which emphasis the goals, purposes, consequences,  interests, values and politics of classification. It is, for example, classifying animals into wild animals, pests, domesticated animals and pets. Also kitchenware (tools, utensils, appliances, dishes, and cookware used in food preparation, or the serving of food) is an example of a classification which is not based on any of the above-mentioned three methods, but clearly on pragmatic or functional criteria. Bonaccorsi et al. (2019) is about the general theory of functional classification and applications of this approach for patent classification. Although the examples may suggest that pragmatic classifications are primitive compared to established scientific classifications, it must be considered in relation to the pragmatic and critical theory of knowledge, which consider all knowledge as influences by interests (cf., Barnes 1977).
Ridley (1986,191) wrote: "teleological classification. Classification of groups by their shared purposes, or functions, in life - where purpose can be identified with adaptation. An imperfectly worked-out, occasionally suggested, theoretically possible principle of classification that differs from the two main such principles, phenetic and phylogenetic classification".

Synonyms and near-synonyms for the term classification 
One or more of the following terms are by some authors considered synonyms for classification while other authors have suggested various ways of differentiating these terms. 
 Concept/conceptualization
 Categorization is, for example, mostly used by cognitive psychologists for what other call classification. Much of the contents of the Wikipedia article categorization is equally true for classification
 Ordering
 Taxonomy was first used in biology, but the term has spread to other domains. There may only be historical reasons that, for example, the periodic table is called a classification rather than a taxonomy 
 Typology
 Division (e.g., logical division)

Examples of important classification systems

The periodic table 
Is the classification of the chemical elements which is in particular associated with Dmitri Mendeleev (cf., History of the periodic table). An authoritative work on this system is Scerri (2020). Hubert Feger (2001, 1967–1968; numbered listing added) wrote about it: A well-known, still used, and expanding classification is Mendelejew's Table of Elements. It can be viewed as a prototype of all taxonomies in that it satisfies the following evaluative criteria:
 Theoretical foundation: A theory determines the classes and their order.
 Objectivity: The elements can be observed and classified by anybody familiar with the table of elements.
 Completeness: All elements find a unique place in the system, and the system implies a list of all possible elements.
 Simplicity: Only a small amount of information is used to establish the system and identify an object.
 Predictions: The values of variables not used for classification can be predicted (number of electrons and atomic weight), as well as the existence of relations and of objects hitherto unobserved. Thus, the validity of the classification system itself becomes testable.

Bursten (2020) wrote, however "Hepler-Smith, a historian of chemistry, and I, a philosopher whose work often draws on
chemistry, found common ground in a shared frustration with our disciplines’ emphases on the chemical elements as the stereotypical example of a natural kind.
The frustration we shared was that while the elements did display many hallmarks of paradigmatic kindhood, elements were not the kinds of kinds that generated
interesting challenges for classification in chemistry, nor even were they the kinds of kinds that occupied much contemporary critical chemical thought. Compounds,
complexes, reaction pathways, substrates, solutions – these were the kinds of the chemistry laboratory, and rarely if ever did they slot neatly into taxonomies in the
orderly manner of classification suggested by the Periodic Table of Elements. A focus on the rational and historical basis of the development of the Periodic Table
had made the received view of chemical classification appear far more pristine, and far less interesting, than either of us believed it to be."

The Linnaean taxonomy 
Is the particular form of biological classification (taxonomy) set up by Carl Linnaeus, as set forth in his Systema Naturae (1735) and subsequent works. A major discussion in the scientific literature is whether a system that was constructed before Charles Darwin's theory of evolution can still be fruitful and reflect the development of life.

Astronomy's Three Kingdom System 
Is a classification of celestial objects suggested by Steven J. Dick (2013 and 2019).
This system classify all celestial objects in 82 classes of objects. The top categories are the three kingdoms: "Kingdom of the Planets", "Kingdom of the Stars" and "Kingdom of the Galaxies". Each kingdom is divided to a number of families and subfamilies and further subdivided to the 82 classes.

Astronomy is a fine example on how Kuhn's (1962) theory of scientific revolutions (or paradigm shifts) influences classification. For example: 
 Paradigm one: Ptolemaic astronomers might learn the concepts “star” and “planet” by having the Sun, the Moon, and Mars pointed out as instances of the concept “planet” and some fixed stars as instances of the concept “star.”
 Paradigm two: Copernicans might learn the concepts “star,” “planet,” and “satellites” by having Mars and Jupiter pointed out as instances of the concept “planet,” the Moon as an instance of the concept “satellite,” and the Sun and some fixed stars as instances of the concept “star.” Thus, the concepts “star,” “planet,” and “satellite” got a new meaning and astronomy got a new classification of celestial bodies.

Hornbostel-Sachs Classification of Musical Instruments 
Is a system of musical instrument classification devised by Erich Moritz von Hornbostel and Curt Sachs, and first published in 1914. In the original classification, the top categories are:
 Idiophones: instruments that rely on the body of the instrument to create and resonate sound. 
 Membranophones: instruments that have a membrane that is stretched over a structure, often wood or metal, and struck or rubbed to produce a sound. The subcategories are largely determined by the shape of the structure that the membrane is stretched over.
 Chordophone: Instruments that use vibrating strings, which are most commonly stretched across a metal or wooden structure, to create sound.
 Aerophones Instruments that require air passing through, or across, them to create sound. Most commonly constructed of wood or metal. 
A fifth top category, 
 Electrophones: Instruments that require electricity to be amplified and heard. This group was added by Sachs in 1940. 
Each top category is subdivided and Hornbostel-Sachs is a very comprehensive classification of musical instruments with wide applications. In Wikipedia, for example, all musical instruments are organized according to this classification.

In opposition to, for example, the astronomical and biological classifications presented above, the Hornbostel-Sachs classification seems very little influenced by research in musicology and organology. It is based on huge collections of musical instruments, but seems rather as a system imposed upon the universe of instruments than as a system with organic connections to scholarly theory. It may therefore be interpreted as a system based on logical division and rationalist philosophy.

Diagnostic and Statistical Manual of Mental Disorders (DSM) 
This is a classification of mental disorders published by the American Psychiatric Association (APA).The first edition of the DSM was published in 1952, and the newest, fifth edition was published in 2013. In contrast to, for example, the periodic table and the Hornbostel-Sachs classification, the principles for classification have changed much during its history. The first edition was influenced by psychodynamic theory, The DSM-III, published in 1980 adopted an atheoretical, “descriptive” approach to classification  The system is very important for all people involved in psychiatry, whether as patients, researchers or therapists (in addition to insurance companies), but the systems is strongly criticized and has not the scientific status as many other classifications.

Some philosophical issues

Artificial versus natural classification 
Natural classification is a concept closely related to the concept natural kind. Carl Linnaeus is often recognized as the first scholar to clearly have differentiated "artificial" and "natural" classifications A natural classification is one, using Plato's metaphor, that is “carving nature at its joints” (Plato c.370 BC) Although Linnaeus considered natural classification the ideal, he recognized that his own system (at least partly) represented an artificial classification. 
John Stuart Mill explained the artificial nature of the Linnaean classification and suggested the following definition of a natural classification:

"The Linnæan arrangement answers the purpose of making us think together of all those kinds of plants, which possess the same number of stamens and pistils; but to think of them in that manner is of little use, since we seldom have anything to affirm in common of the plants which have a given number of stamens and pistils (Mill 1872, 498).
The ends of scientific classification are best answered, when the objects are formed into groups respecting which a greater number of general propositions can be made, and those propositions more important, than could be made respecting any other groups into which the same things could be distributed [...]
A classification thus formed is properly scientific or philosophical, and is commonly called a Natural, in contradistinction to a Technical or Artificial, classification or arrangement (Mill 1872, 499)."

Ridley (1986) provided the following definitions: 
 "artificial classification. The term (like its opposite, natural classification) has many meanings; in this book I have picked a phenetic meaning. A classificatory group will be defined by certain characters, called defining characters; in an artificial classification, the members of a group resemble one another in their defining characters (as they must, by definition) but not in their non-defining characters. With respect to the characters not used in the classification, the members of a group are uncorrelated.
 "natural classification. Classificatory groups are defined by certain characters, called 'defining' characters; in a natural group, the members of the group resemble one another for non-defining characters as well as for the defining character. This is not the only meaning for what is perhaps the most variously used term in taxonomy ...

Taxonomic monism vs. pluralism 
Stamos (2004, 138) wrote: "The fact is, modern scientists classify atoms into elements based on proton number rather than anything else because it alone is the causally privileged factor [gold is atomic number 79 in the periodic table because it has 79 protons in its nucleus]. Thus nature itself has supplied the causal monistic essentialism. Scientists in their turn simply discover and follow (where "simply" ≠ "easily")."

See also 
 Biological classification
 Categorization 
 Chemical classification
 Classification theorem
 Folk taxonomy
 Library classification 
 Medical classification
 Statistical classification 
 Taxonomy (general)

References

External links 
 Parrochia, Daniel 2016. "Classification". In The Internet Encyclopedia of Philosophy eds. James Fieser and Bradley Dowden.

Theories
Classification systems